The Basilica de la Merced is a basilica located in Santiago, Chile. It was founded by the Order of the Blessed Virgin Mary of Mercy and constructed in 1795. It is a Chilean National Monument. 

It is Neo-Renaissance in architecture and has a small museum with religious objects and art, including a collection of pieces from Easter Island. The collection includes a rongorongo tablet, one of 29 left in the world.

References

Churches in Santiago, Chile
Museums in Santiago, Chile
Religious museums in Chile
Basilica churches in Chile